The Royal College of Midwives (RCM) is a British midwives organisation founded in 1881 by Louisa Hubbard and Zepherina Veitch. It has existed under its present name since 1947, and is the United Kingdom's only trade union or professional organisation for midwives and those that support them. Gill Walton is the current Chief Executive.

History
The precursor of the College was the Matron's Aid Society later known as the Trained Midwives Registration Society, set up in London in 1881 by Louisa Hubbard, Zepherina Veitch and some of her colleagues. Its aim was to "raise the efficiency and improve the status of midwives and to petition parliament for their recognition". Shortly afterwards its name was changed to the Midwives' Institute and there followed a period of about twenty years of campaigning before the government was persuaded to regulate the profession. The Midwives' Act was passed in 1902 and after that it was illegal for any unqualified person in England or Wales to act as a midwife. Similar legislation was implemented in Scotland in 1915 and in Northern Ireland in 1922.

The training of midwives was done by the Central Midwives' Board. Lectures were given and a journal was produced. The fees charged by midwives were low and if a doctor was needed to assist at the birth, further fees were required by him. By 1901 the Institute had established a scheme for providing insurance for midwives who were forced to be in quarantine after attending a case of puerperal fever, had to defend themselves at inquests or pay fees to doctors. By 1919, local authorities were required to pay the doctor's fee and then recoup the sum back from the family. The Institute continued to campaign and in 1936, the Midwives' Act was passed. This encouraged training, introduced a diploma for those who passed an examination and instituted five-yearly refresher courses. The Institute undertook a study into why the maternal death rate was so high. In 1941, it changed its name to the College of Midwives and in 1947, it was given a royal charter by King George VI.

Organisation
The Royal College of Midwives has a Board consisting of qualified midwives which governs and manages the organisation. It also has a charitable organisation, the RCM Trust, which funds research, provides information to the public, provides education and training to its members and organises meetings, conferences and other events. The RCM Trust has a trading arm and runs the Benevolent Fund to assist members in need of financial assistance.

The RCM is affiliated to the TUC.

Industrial action
The Royal College of Midwives staged its first ever strike on 13 October 2014 in protest against the decision that only NHS staff at the top of their pay band would receive a 1% pay increase, while the remaining 55% of the workforce would only get annual incremental rises.

Leadership
The Royal College of Midwives has two leadership positions: the chief executive is in charge of the day-to-day management of the college, and the President is the ceremonial figurehead and main ambassadorial representative.

List of chief executives
Gill Walton (2017 to present)
Professor Dame Cathy Warwick (2008 to 2017)

List of presidents
Maggie O’Brien (2004 to 2008)
Liz Stephens (2008 to 2012)
Professor Lesley Page (2012 to 2017)
Kathryn Gutteridge (2017 to present)

References

External links
Royal College of Midwives website

Health in the City of Westminster
Organisations based in the City of Westminster
Organizations established in 1947
Women's organisations based in the United Kingdom
Midwifery organizations
Medical associations based in the United Kingdom
1947 establishments in the United Kingdom
Midwifery in the United Kingdom
Trade unions affiliated with the Trades Union Congress